Guido da Suzzara (c. 1225-1292) was an Italian jurist. He was defense counsel at the trial of Conradin. Joseph Canning comments that he was important in establishing that the princeps was bound by his contracts and privileges [...].

Notes

External links

13th-century Italian jurists
1220s births
1292 deaths
Year of birth uncertain